Chersonesia rahria is an Indomalayan butterfly of the family Nymphalidae (Cyrestinae). It is found from Manipur and Naga Hills to Burma then from Borneo to Celebes.

Subspecies
C. r. rahria (Peninsular Malaya, Java, Sumatra, Borneo)
C. r. tiomana Pendlebury, 1933 (Pulau Tioman)
C. r. apicusta Hagen, 1898 (Mentawai Islands)
C. r. sanna Fruhstorfer, 1906 (Batu Island)
C. r. celebensis (Rothschild, 1892) (Sulawesi)
C. r. mangolina Fruhstorfer, 1899 (Sula Islands)
C. r. banggaina Tsukada & Nishiyama, 1985 (Banggai)

References

Cyrestinae
Butterflies described in 1858